Uncial 0104 (in the Gregory-Aland numbering), ε 44 (Soden), is a Greek uncial manuscript of the New Testament. It is dated paleographically to the 6th-century.

Description 
The codex contains a small parts of the Matthew 23:7-22; Mark 1:27-41; 13:12-14:3 on four parchment leaves (32 by 22 cm). It is written in two columns per page, 36 lines per page, in large uncial letters. It is a palimpsest, the upper text contains a homily in Hebrew.

It contains lectionary markings at the margin (for liturgical use).

The Greek text of this codex is a representative of the Byzantine text-type. Aland placed it in Category V.

Currently it is dated by the INTF to the 6th-century.

The codex now is located in the Bibliothèque nationale de France (Suppl. Gr. 726, ff. 1-5, 8-10), at Paris.

See also 

 List of New Testament uncials
 Textual criticism

References

Further reading 
 J. H. Greenlee, Nine Uncial Palimpsests of the New Testament, Studies & Documents XXXIX (Salt Lake City, 1968).

Greek New Testament uncials
6th-century biblical manuscripts
Palimpsests
Bibliothèque nationale de France collections